The Durrani Empire or the Afghan Empire, also known as the Sadozai Kingdom, was an Afghan empire that was founded by Ahmad Shah Durrani in 1747 and spanned parts of Central Asia, the Iranian plateau, and the Indian Subcontinent. At its largest territorial extent, it ruled over the present-day Afghanistan, Pakistan, parts of northeastern and southeastern Iran, eastern Turkmenistan, and northwestern India. Next to the Ottoman Empire, the Durrani Empire is considered to be among the most impactful Muslim empires of the latter half of the 18th century.

Ahmad was the son of Muhammad Zaman Khan (an Afghan chieftain of the Abdali tribe) and the commander of Nader Shah Afshar. Following Afshar's death in June 1747, Ahmad secured Afghanistan by taking Kandahar, Ghazni, Kabul, and Peshawar. After his accession as the nation's king, he changed his tribal name from Abdali to Durrani. In 1749, the Mughal Empire had ceded sovereignty over much of northwestern India to the Afghans; Ahmad then set out westward to take possession of Mashhad, which was ruled by the Afsharid dynasty under Shahrokh Shah, who also acknowledged Afghan suzerainty. Subsequently, Ahmad sent an army to subdue the areas north of the Hindu Kush down to the Amu Darya, and in short order, all of the different Afghan tribes began to join his cause. Under Ahmad, the Afghans invaded India on four occasions, subjugating parts of Kashmir and the majority of Punjab. In early 1757, he sacked Delhi, but permitted Mughal emperor Alamgir II to remain in nominal control as long as he acknowledged Afghan suzerainty over the regions south of the Indus River.

Following Ahmad's death in 1772, his son Timur Shah Durrani became the next ruler of the Durrani dynasty. Under Timur, the city of Kabul became the new capital of the Durrani Empire while Peshawar served as its winter capital; however, the empire had begun to crumble by this time. The dynasty would become heirs of Afghanistan for generations, up until Dost Muhammad Khan and the Barakzai dynasty deposed the Durrani dynasty in Kabul, leading to its supersession by the Emirate of Afghanistan. The Durrani Empire is considered to be the foundational polity of the modern nation-state of Afghanistan, with Ahmad being credited as its Father of the Nation.

Reign of Ahmad Shah Durrani (1747–1772)

Foundation of the Afghan state
In 1709 Mirwais Hotak, chief of the Ghilji tribe of Kandahar Province, gained independence from the Safavid Persians. From 1722 to 1725, his son Mahmud Hotak briefly ruled large parts of Iran and declared himself as Shah of Persia. However, the Hotak dynasty came to a complete end in 1738 after being toppled and banished by the Afsharids who were led by Nader Shah Afshar of Persia.

The year 1747 marks the definitive appearance of an Afghan political entity independent of both the Persian and Mughal empires. In July of that year a loya jirga (grand council) was called into session. The jirga lasted for nine days and two chief contestants emerged: Hajji Jamal Khan of the Mohammadzai lineage and Ahmad Khan of the Sadozai. Mohammad Sabir Khan, a noted darwish (holy man), who had earlier predicted that Ahmad Khan would be the leader of the Afghans, rose in the jirga and said

Ahmad Khan reputedly hesitated to accept the open decision of the jirga, so Sabir Khan again intervened. He placed some wheat or barley sheaves in Ahmad Khan's turban, and crowned him Badshah, Durr-i-Dauran (Shah, Pearl of the Age). The jirga concluded near the city of Kandahar with Ahmad Shah Durrani being selected as the new leader of the Afghans, thus the Durrani dynasty was founded. Despite being younger than the other contenders, Ahmad Shah had several overriding factors in his favor. He belonged to a respectable family of political background, especially since his father had served as Governor of Herat who died in a battle defending the Afghans.

Early victories

One of Ahmad Shah's first military actions was to capture Qalati Ghilji and Ghazni from the Ghilji, and wrest Kabul and Peshawar from Mughal-appointed governor Nasir Khan. In 1749, the Mughal Emperor Ahmad Shah Bahadur was induced to cede Sindh, the Punjab region and the important trans Indus River to Ahmad Shah Durrani in order to save his capital from Afghan attack. Having thus gained substantial territories to the east without a fight, Ahmad Shah turned westward to take possession of Mashhad, which was ruled by Nader Shah Afshar's grandson, Shahrukh Afshar. Ahmad Shah next sent an army to subdue the areas north of the Hindu Kush mountains. In short order, the powerful army brought under its control the Tajik, Hazara, Uzbek, Turkmen, and other tribes of northern Afghanistan. Ahmad Shah invaded the remnants of the Mughal Empire a third time, and then a fourth, consolidating control over the Kashmir and Punjab regions, with Lahore being governed by Afghans. He sacked Delhi in 1757 but permitted the Mughal dynasty to remain in nominal control of the city as long as the ruler acknowledged Ahmad Shah's suzerainty over Punjab, Sindh, and Kashmir. Leaving his second son Timur Shah to safeguard his interests, Ahmad Shah left India to return to Afghanistan.

Relations with China
Alarmed by the expansion of China's Qing Dynasty up to the eastern border of Kazakhstan, Ahmad Shah attempted to rally neighboring Muslim khanates and the Kazakhs to unite and attack China, ostensibly to liberate its western Muslim subjects. Ahmad Shah halted trade with Qing China and dispatched troops to Kokand. However, with his campaigns in India exhausting the state treasury, and with his troops stretched thin throughout Central Asia, Ahmad Shah lacked sufficient resources to do anything except to send envoys to Beijing for unsuccessful talks.

Third Battle of Panipat

The Mughal power in northern India had been declining after the death of Emperor Aurangzeb, who died in 1707. In 1751–52, the Ahamdiya treaty was signed between the Marathas and Mughals, when Balaji Bajirao was the Peshwa. Through this treaty, the Marathas controlled virtually the whole of India from their capital at Pune and the Mughal rule was restricted only to Delhi (the Mughals remained the nominal heads of Delhi). Marathas were now straining to expand their area of control towards the Northwest of India. Ahmad Shah sacked the Mughal capital and withdrew with the booty he coveted. To counter the Afghans, Peshwa Balaji Bajirao sent Raghunathrao. He defeated the Rohillas and Afghan garrisons in Punjab and succeeded in ousting Timur Shah and his court from India and brought Lahore, Multan, Kashmir and other subahs on the Indian side of Attock under Maratha rule. Thus, upon his return to Kandahar in 1757, Ahmad was forced to return to India and face the formidable attacks of the Maratha Confederacy.

Ahmad Shah declared a jihad (or Islamic holy war) against the Marathas, and warriors from various Afghan tribes joined his army, including the Baloch people under the command of Khan of Kalat Mir Nasir I of Kalat. Suba Khan Tanoli (Zabardast Khan) was selected as army chief of all military forces. Early skirmishes were followed by victory for the Afghans against the much larger Maratha garrisons in Northwest India and by 1759 Ahmad Shah and his army had reached Lahore and were poised to confront the Marathas. Ahmad Shah Durrani was famous for winning wars much larger than his army. By 1760, the Maratha groups had coalesced into a big enough army under the command of Sadashivrao Bhau. Once again, Panipat was the scene of a confrontation between two warring contenders for control of northern India. The Third Battle of Panipat (14 January 1761), fought between largely Muslim and largely Hindu armies was waged along a twelve-kilometer front. Despite decisively defeating the Marathas, what might have been Ahmad Shah's peaceful control of his domains was disrupted by many challenges. As far as losses are concerned, Afghans too suffered heavily in the Third Battle of Panipat. This weakened his grasp over Punjab which fell to the rising Sikh misls. There were rebellions in the north in the region of Bukhara. The Durranis decisively defeated the Marathas in the Third Battle of Panipat on 14 January 1761. The defeat at Panipat resulted in heavy losses for the Marathas, and was a huge setback for Peshwa Balaji Rao. He received the news of the defeat of Panipat on 24 January 1761 at Bhilsa, while leading a reinforcement force. Besides several important generals, he had lost his own son Vishwasrao in the Battle of Panipat. He died on 23 June 1761, and was succeeded by his younger son Madhav Rao I.

Final years

The victory at Panipat was the high point of Ahmad Shah's—and Afghan—power. However, even prior to his death, the empire began to unravel. In 1762, Ahmad Shah crossed the passes from Afghanistan for the sixth time to subdue the Sikhs. From this time and on, the domination and control of the Empire began to loosen, and by the time of Durrani's death he had lost parts of Punjab to the Sikhs, as well as earlier losses of northern territories to the Uzbeks, necessitating a compromise with them.

He assaulted Lahore and, after taking their holy city of Amritsar, massacred thousands of Sikh inhabitants, destroyed their revered Golden Temple. Within two years, the Sikhs rebelled again and rebuilt their holy city of Amritsar. Ahmad Shah tried several more times to subjugate the Sikhs permanently, but failed. Durrani's forces instigated the Vaḍḍā Ghallūghārā when they killed thousands of Sikhs in the Punjab in 1762. Ahmad Shah also faced other 
rebellions in the north, and eventually he and the Uzbek Emir of Bukhara agreed that the Amu Darya would mark the division of their lands. Ahmad Shah retired to his home in the mountains east of Kandahar, where he died in 1772. He had succeeded to a remarkable degree in balancing tribal alliances and hostilities, and in directing tribal energies away from rebellion. He earned recognition as Ahmad Shah Baba, or "Father" of Afghanistan.

The Durrani Empire lost its control over Kashmir to the Sikh Empire in the Battle of Shopian in 1819.

Other Durrani rulers in the Empire (1772–1823)
Ahmad Shah's successors governed so ineptly during a period of profound unrest that within fifty years of his death, the Durrani empire per se was at an end, and Afghanistan was embroiled in civil war. Much of the territory conquered by Ahmad Shah fell to others in this half century. By 1818, the Sadozai rulers who succeeded Ahmad Shah controlled little more than Kabul and the surrounding territory within a 160-kilometer radius. They not only lost the outlying territories but also alienated other tribes and lineages among the Durrani Pashtuns.

Humayun Mirza (1772)
A few months before his death, Ahmad Shah summoned Timur Shah from Herat and publicly declared him heir to the Durrani Empire. Ahmad Shah made this decision without consulting with his tribal council, as a result the authority of the Durrani Emperor was put into question and created a growing rift that would toil the Durrani empire for years to come, as the tribal council had in majority, supported Ahmad Shah's eldest son and Timur Shah's brother, Sulaiman, the governor of Kandahar. Prominent figures in court who supported the Sulaiman faction were Shah Wali Khan, Ahmad Shah's Wazir, and Sardar Jahan Khan. The court had attempted to urge Ahmad Shah to reconsider his decision, coinciding with the fact that the eldest son should ascend to the throne. Ahmad had ignored this, and quoted: "Timur Shah was infinitely more capable of governing you than his brother". As well as accusing Sulaiman of being "Violent without clemency", and out of favour with the Kandahari Durranis. Ahmad Shah's decision could have been influenced by his illness, which had affected his brain and his mental state. However, choosing Timur Shah as a successor was likely to restrict power of the Senior Generals and the Durrani Tribal Council, which he deemed as a threat to his dynasty in the future.

When Ahmad Shah was on his death bed, Sadar Jahan Khan had capitalized on Timur Shah's far proximity with him ruling over Herat, and poisoned the ear of the Shah. This had worked as Timur Shah was denied an by Ahmad Shah on his deathbed, as a result, Timur Shah had begun mobilizing his forces for the inevitable conflict with his brother. Timur Shah's plans were stalled, however, as a rebellion by Darwish Ali Khan under the Sunni Hazaras, likely instigated by the Sulaiman faction had risen up. Timur Shah had crushed this revolt quickly and Darwish Khan was imprisoned; however, he later escaped. Timur Shah had then lured him into Herat, offering pardon, where then Timur Shah had ordered his execution where his nephew, Muhammad Khan would be appointed in his place.

During the revolt of Darwish, Ahmad Shah had died of his illness in 1772. Shah Wali Khan and Sardar Jahan Khan kept the Shah's death a secret by placing the body on a palanquin covered by thick curtains. They had then left the King's mountain, taking as much treasure as they could and marched to Kandahar. Shah Wali Khan had also announced to everyone that the king was ill and had given orders to not disturb him except his trusted officials. To make the deception more believable, Ahmad Shah's chief eunuch, Yaqut Khan had brought food for the "Sick" Ruler. Shah wali Khan had then notified Sulaiman that Ahmad Shah was dead and proclaimed Sulaiman as king. However, many of the Amirs including Mahadad Khan had disliked Shah Wali's ambitions, and thus had fled to Timur's side, also notifying him of the ongoing situation at Kandahar. Timur Shah had then marched toward Kandahar to face Shah Humayun. Shah Wali, fearing of Timur's march had consulted with Shah Humayun, and had agreed on him marching out to Prince Timur Shah to welcome him. He left Kandahar with over 150 horsemen and had arrived at Prince Timur's force at Farah. Having not sent word, once Shah Wali had dismounted, Timur Shah ordered the killing of Shah Wali. Angu Khan Bamiza'i assassinated Shah Wali Khan and his two sons, including 2 of his sisters children. Shah Sulayman surrendered the throne to Timur Shah following this, and became a loyal follower of him according to the depiction of Amir Habibullah Khan. Timur Shah ascended the throne in November 1772.

Timur Shah (1772–1793)

After his father, Ahmad Shah Durrani's death, he fought his brother Humayun Mirza for the throne, with Humayun supported by Shah Wali Khan. Shah Wali was killed by Timur Shah as he attempted to ride into his camp and beg for peace and mercy. Timur Shah then marched to Kandahar, forcing Humayun to either flee or stay as a devout supporter for Timur Shah. With his throne secured, he began consolidating his power, with efforts to drive power away from the Durrani Pashtuns, and more toward the growing influential Qizilbash and Mongol guards consisted in his army. Timur Shah would also move the capital of the Durrani Realm from Kandahar to Kabul, as a better base of operation to combat any threat arriving from anywhere, as Kabul was essentially the heart of the empire. After consolidating his power, Timur Shah marched against the Sikh's in 1780 in a Jihad, and decisively defeated the Sikhs, forcing them to return Multan toward Durrani Suzerainty after it was seized after the death of Ahmad Shah Durrani. Timur Shah, having secured Punjab, also faced recurring rebellions against him, including an assassination attempt early in his reign at Peshawar. Timur Shah would encounter harsh resistance and rebellion, prominently those of Fayz Allah Khan, Azad Khan, and Arsalan Khan. Timur Shah in his reign also fought against Shah Murad, the ruler of Bukhara who attempted raids into Afghan Turkestan and Khorasan, often harassing the Durrani vassal of the Afsharid dynasty centred in Mashhad. In conclusion, Timur Shah spent most of his reign consolidating the empire, while also fighting off rebellion, he prove himself as a competent leader from holding the unstable empire apart. Timur Shah died on 20 May 1793, succeeded by his son, Zaman Shah Durrani

Zaman Shah (1793–1801)

After the death of Timur Shah, three of his sons, the governors of Kandahar, Herat and Kabul, contended for the succession. Zaman Shah, governor of Kabul, held the field by virtue of being in control of the capital, and became shah at the age of twenty-three. Many of his half-brothers were imprisoned on their arrival in the capital for the purpose, ironically, of electing a new shah. The quarrels among Timur's descendants that threw Afghanistan into turmoil also provided the pretext for the interventions of outside forces.

The efforts of the Sadozai heirs of Timur to impose a true monarchy on the truculent Pashtun tribes, and their efforts to rule absolutely and without the advice of the other major Pashtun tribal leaders, were ultimately unsuccessful. The Sikhs started to rise under the command of Sikh chief, Ranjit Singh, who succeeded in wresting power from Zaman's forces. Later, when Zaman was blinded by his brother, Ranjit Singh gave him asylum in Punjab.

Zaman's downfall was triggered by his attempts to consolidate power. Although it had been through the support of the Barakzai chief, Painda Khan Barakzai, that he had come to the throne, Zaman soon began to remove prominent Barakzai leaders from positions of power and replace them with men of his own lineage, the Sadozai. This upset the delicate balance of Durrani tribal politics that Ahmad Shah had established and may have prompted Painda Khan and other Durrani chiefs to plot against the shah. Painda Khan and the chiefs of the Nurzai and the Alizai Durrani clans were executed, as was the chief of the Qizilbash clan. Painda Khan's son fled to Iran and pledged the substantial support of his Barakzai followers to a rival claimant to the throne, Zaman's younger brother, Mahmud Shah. The clans of the chiefs Zaman had executed joined forces with the rebels, and they took Kandahar without bloodshed. Mahmud Shah had then proceeded to march to Kabul, where he met Zaman Shah and his army on the way from Ghanzi to Kabul, Zaman Shah was decisively defeated, including portions of his army fleeing to Mahmud Shah's cause. Mahmud Shah ordered the lancing of Zaman Shah's eyes, and had succeeded Zaman Shah on the throne of the Durrani Empire.

Mahmud Shah (first reign, 1801–1803)

Zaman Shah's overthrow in 1801 was not the end of civil strife in Afghanistan, but the beginning of even greater violence. Mahmud Shah's first reign lasted for only two years before he was replaced by Shuja Shah.

Shuja Shah (1803–1809 and 1839–1842)

Yet another of Timur Shah's sons, Shuja Shah (or Shah Shuja), ruled for only six years. On June 7, 1809, Shuja Shah signed a treaty with the British, which included a clause stating that he would oppose the passage of foreign troops through his territories. This agreement, the first Afghan pact with a European power, stipulated joint action in case of Franco-Persian aggression against Afghan or British dominions. Only a few weeks after signing the agreement, Shuja was deposed by his predecessor, Mahmud. Much later, he was reinstated by the British, ruling during 1839–1842. Two of his sons also ruled for a brief period in 1842.

Mahmud Shah (second reign, 1809–1818)

Mahmud's second reign lasted 9 years, where he had further attempted to consolidate power, but was deposed by his brother in 1818, Mahmud's reign was also disputed in 1810, while he was campaigning, another one of Timur Shah Durrani's sons had seized the throne, but was defeated by Shah Mahmud in 1810.

Abbas Mirza (1810)
While Mahmud Shah was campaigning in 1810, another one of Timur Shah's sons placed himself in rule at Kabul. Abbas Mirza ruled for a short period of time before being defeated by Mahmud Shah once he returned from campaign.

Sultan Ali Shah (1818–1819)

Ali Shah was another son of Timur Shah. He seized power for a brief period in 1818–1819. in 1818 or 1819, He was strangled by his brother, Isma'il.

Ayub Shah (1819–1823)

Ayub Shah was another son of Timur Shah, who took control of the Durrani Empire after the death of Ali Shah Durrani. The Durrani Empire lost its control over Kashmir to the Sikh Empire in the Battle of Shopian in 1819. Ayub Shah was himself later deposed, and presumably killed in 1823.

Durrani Herat (1793–1863)

Shah Shuja and the First Anglo Afghan War (1839–1842)
In the 19th century as a whole, Britain and Russia were interlocked in a battle for influence in South Asia. Russian advance was trudging through Central Asia, while the British were landing in the masses on the Indian subcontinent. The "Army of the Indus", full of both British and Indian infantrymen and cavalrymen, lined up on the border of the Durrani Empire, in Punjab. By March 1839, the British had already crossed into the Emirate of Kabul.

Military
The Durrani military was based on cavalry armed with flintlocks who performed hit-and-run attacks, combining new technology in firearms with Turco-Mongol tactics. The core of the Durrani army were the 10,000 sher-bacha (blunderbuss)-carrying mounted ghulams (slave-soldiers) of which a third were previously Shia soldiers (Qizilbash) of Nader Shah. Many others were also former troops of Nader Shah. The bulk of the army were Afghan irregular tribal cavalry armed with lance and broadsword. Mounted archers were still used but were uncommon due to the difficulty of training them. Infantry played a very small role in the Durrani army and, with the exception of light swivel guns mounted on camels, the Zamburak, so did artillery.

See also
 Indian campaign of Ahmad Shah Durrani
 List of Pashtun empires and dynasties
 Deoni

Notes

References

Sources

External links

Afghanistan 1747–1809: Sources in the India Office Records
Biography of Ahmad Shah Abdali (Durrani)
Ahmad Shah Baba
History of Abdali tribe
Afghanistan and the Search for Unity Article on Durrani methods of government, published in Asian Affairs, Volume 38, Issue 2, 2007, pp. 145–157.

 
.
Empires and kingdoms of Afghanistan
Empires and kingdoms of Pakistan
Former empires in Asia
Muslim empires
Islamic rule in the Indian subcontinent
Modern history of Afghanistan
History of Pakistan
History of Khyber Pakhtunkhwa
States and territories established in 1747
States and territories disestablished in 1823
States and territories established in 1839
States and territories disestablished in 1842
1747 establishments in Asia
1823 disestablishments in Asia
18th century in Afghanistan
19th century in Afghanistan
18th century in the Mughal Empire
Former countries in Central Asia
Former countries in South Asia